Benjamin Robinson was an English footballer who played in the Football League for Coventry City.

References

English footballers
Association football midfielders
English Football League players
Coventry City F.C. players
Nuneaton Borough F.C. players